The Pierre Elliott Trudeau Foundation, commonly called the Trudeau Foundation, is a Canadian charity founded in 2001 by friends and family of former Canadian prime minister Pierre Trudeau.

The foundation supports creative and critical thinkers who make meaningful contributions to pressing social issues through scholarships, fellowships, mentorships and public interaction events. It has granted hundreds of significant awards to top researchers and highly accomplished individuals in Canada and abroad.

Leadership
The Pierre Elliott Trudeau Foundation has had four presidents since its inception in 2001. The first president and CEO of the foundation, Stephen J. Toope, took up his position at the beginning of August 2002. An Interim President, Frederick H. Lowy, served from June, 2006 through to October 2006 after Toope left to become president of the University of British Columbia. Pierre-Gerlier Forest, formerly chief scientist at Health Canada, was the president of the foundation from November 2006 to September 2013. Tim Brodhead became interim president and chief executive officer as of 17 September 2013. In April 2014, Morris Rosenberg was appointed president and chief executive officer.

Funding
In 2002, the Government of Canada endowed the Pierre Elliott Trudeau Foundation with $125 million CAD, to fund the creation of a program for advanced studies in the social sciences and the humanities. An agreement on the Advanced Research in the Humanities and Human Sciences Fund was signed March 2002, between the Government of Canada and the foundation outlining the obligations of the foundation in handling public funds in regards to investment strategy, governance and program delivery. The foundation also solicits private funding for targeted projects.

Directed donation from Chinese government
In February 2023, the Globe and Mail reported that the Pierre Elliott Trudeau Foundation received a $200,000 donation from Chinese Billionaire Zhang Bin. This donation was allegedly made at the direction of the Chinese government, with the promise that the government would repay the donation, according to anonymous unconfirmed CSIS sources. The donation was allegedly accepted by then CEO Morris Rosenberg. In March 2023, Mr. Rosenberg defended acceptance of the donation by saying that Canada and China had had a better relationship at time. According to the same unconfirmed CSIS sources, an additional $750,000 was donated to Pierre Trudeau's alma matter, the University of Montreal’s Faculty of Law, while $50,000 was allegedly donated for the construction of a statue at the University of Montreal. According to the unconfirmed CSIS sources, Mr. Zhang had originally requested that the statue be of both Pierre Trudeau and Mao Zedong, but the University rebuffed this proposal and a statue of only Pierre Trudeau was ultimately planned. According to the Globe and Mail, Alexandre Trudeau attended an event commemorating the combined $1-million donation as a director and member of the Pierre Elliott Trudeau Foundation, with Mr. Zhang and Chinese consulate staff in attendance. Allegations regarding the role of the Chinese Communist Party in directing and funding the donation were revealed as part of a series of leaks claiming to be from the Canadian Security Intelligence Service regarding Chinese political interference in Canada. On March 1, 2023, the Trudeau Foundation announced that it will return the $140,000 that it has thus far received from Mr. Zhang. The remainder of Mr. Zhang's $200,000 donation was never received. Justin Trudeau divested his interest in the Pierre Elliot Trudeau Foundation in 2013 when he entered federal politics, but Justin's brother Alexandre Trudeau remains a foundation board member.

Themes

Human rights and dignity
The purpose of pursuing and establishing civil, political, economic and social rights is to preserve and promote human dignity, in all its aspects and dimensions. All human beings should be able to lead a life within society that reflects their common values and aspirations, in spite of differences.

Responsible citizenship
While powerful forces are pushing for integration on a planetary scale, cultural, ethnic and religious divisions appear to be growing stronger, with an increasing risk of loss of social cohesion. The rights and obligations conferred by citizenship are not equitably distributed at local, national or global levels; in the global economic context, the separation between private and public spheres of responsibility has begun to blur. Proponents of true democracy acknowledge the pluralist environment in a spirit of tolerance and shared social responsibility.

Canada in the World
Canada's tradition of responsible engagement in international affairs is an integral part of our identity. Through experiences such as immigration, travel, and instant global communications, the Canadian public has become more aware of complex international realities, whether they relate to commerce, culture or security. Our concepts of risk, social obligation and engagement are evolving. We have a clear need to rethink foreign policy and reflect on the opportunities and challenges that affect Canada's role in critical areas such as environmental protection and cooperation between nations.

People and their natural environment
Environmental issues are pervasive, a source of concern for individuals around the globe. Competition for food, water, clean air and natural resources is leading to conflict. Like other countries, Canada must acknowledge the degradation of the natural environment and the threat this poses to the health and security of Canadians. New sustainable ecological measures and human adaptation may reduce the risk of confrontation among different sectors of society and countries; the concept of environmental justice will drive changes in the economic, political and social order.

Programs

Trudeau Scholarships

Trudeau Scholarships are awarded each year to support doctoral candidates pursuing research of "compelling present-day concern," touching on one or more of the four themes of the foundation. Scholars are typically "highly talented individuals who are actively and concretely engaged in their fields and expected to become leading national and international figures." In addition, Trudeau Scholars often work as part of their scholarship with Trudeau Mentors and Fellows. Public engagement is a core component to the Trudeau Doctoral Scholarship program. Scholarships are valued at $60,000 CAD per year, normally for three years. The Trudeau Scholarship program is considered to be among the most prestigious doctoral awards in Canada for students interested in major social and public policy issues.

Trudeau Fellowships

Up to five Trudeau Fellows are chosen each year in recognition of "outstanding achievement, innovative approaches to issues of public policy and commitment to public engagement." Support is provided for Fellows to make "extraordinary contributions in their fields through leading-edge research and creative work."

According to foundation documentation, there are three main aims of the fellowship program. First, it is '"intended to reward exceptional individuals who use evidence and creativity to inform public discourse and policy." Next, the program "fosters the best multidisciplinary research and knowledge dissemination within the social sciences and the humanities." Lastly, the program "strives to establish Trudeau Fellows as outstanding participants within the universities, to challenge and encourage the next generation of scholars."

Trudeau Fellowships are valued at $225,000 CAD over three years.

Trudeau Mentorships

Up to twelve Trudeau Mentors are appointed each year. The Mentorship program seeks to forge intellectual and personal bonds between renowned Canadians with extensive experience in public life and talented, young doctoral students who have been awarded Trudeau Scholarships.

Mentors are drawn from a wide array of professional backgrounds, including the arts, journalism, business, public service, the legal profession, research and advocacy. Trudeau Mentors have typically earned a nationwide and international reputation based on achievements in their own particular field, and are able to introduce Scholars to their networks.

Trudeau Mentor candidates are screened and selected by an independent File Review Committee composed of a majority of senior decision-makers and social entrepreneurs, including leading members of the media, business and policy community. Trudeau Mentorships are valued at $35,000 CAD over four years.

Public Interaction Program
The Trudeau Foundation's Public Interaction Program (PIP) is designed to integrate the foundation's three grant-giving programs by providing recipients with opportunities to learn and exchange research, ideas and proposals that focus on specific questions, and to share relevant knowledge with colleagues from different disciplines and varied life and cultural backgrounds.

In addition to PIP events organized by the foundation, members of the Trudeau Community are encouraged to organize PIP events on major issues of public policy that affect Canadians and global society.

Governance

Board of directors
The foundation is governed by an independent and pan-Canadian Board of directors. Board members who serve for renewable terms of two years. The board and its committees – Audit Committee, Finance and Investment Committee, Application and Nomination Review Committee – support the Foundation President in strategic decisions and the implementation of diligent and transparent management practices.

Current board members
Michel Bastarache, counsel, Heenan Blaikie LLP; former justice of the Supreme Court of Canada
David L. Emerson, former Cabinet Minister, corporate director, public policy and business advisor
Alexander Himelfarb, former ambassador of Canada to the Italian Republic
Chaviva Hošek, former president and CEO of the Canadian Institute for Advanced Research
Edward Johnson, senior vice-president, general counsel and secretary, Power Corporation of Canada
Paule Leduc, former rector of the Université du Québec à Montréal
Patrick Pichette, executive at Bombardier Inc., senior vice-president and chief financial officer, Google Inc.
Marc Renaud, professor, Université de Montréal; former president, Social Sciences and Humanities Research Council
Sean E. Riley, president, St. Francis Xavier University
Emőke Szathmáry, president and vice-chancellor, The University of Manitoba
Alexandre Trudeau, documentary filmmaker
Jason Luckerhoff, Université du Québec à Trois-Rivières

Former board members
 Roy L. Heenan
 Paul G. Desmarais
 Paul Desmarais jr.
 William G. Davis
 Louise Fréchette
 Milton K. Wong
 Robert Lacroix
 Marc Lalonde
 Peter Lougheed
 L. Jacques Ménard
 Heather Munroe-Blum
 Martha Piper
 Bob Rae
 Jacques Hébert
 Louise Houle
 Bruce McNiven
John H. McCall MacBain was the Trudeau Foundation's Chair of the Board.

Members of the foundation
Members of the Trudeau Foundation provide general oversight for the foundation through advice to the directors and the foundation staff. They meet once a year at the annual meeting of the members, where they appoint external auditors and new directors and members as required. Applications are received by the nominating committee.

Foundation members
Patricia E. Bovey, Winnipeg, Manitoba
Dennis M. Browne, St John's, Newfoundland and Labrador
William G. Davis, Toronto, Ontario
John English, Kitchener, Ontario
Justice Eileen E. Gillese, Toronto, Ontario
Ron Graham, Toronto, Ontario
Roy L. Heenan, Montréal, Quebec
Alex Himelfarb, Ottawa, Ontario
Louise Houle, Montreal, Quebec; secretary
Edward Johnson, Montreal, Quebec
Marc Lalonde, Montreal, Quebec
Joseph MacInnis, Toronto, Ontario
Bruce McNiven, Montreal, Quebec; treasurer
Robert W. Murdoch, Salt Spring Island, British Columbia
Laura-Julie Perreault, Montréal, Quebec
Michael P. Pitfield, Montréal, Quebec
Roy J. Romanow, Saskatoon, Saskatchewan
Peter Sahlas, Paris, France
Nancy Southam, Montréal, Quebec
Alexandre Trudeau, Montréal, Quebec
 Thomas Axworthy, Toronto, Ontario
 Frederick Lowy, Toronto, Ontario
 Janice Gross Stein, Toronto, Ontario
 Stephen J. Toope, Toronto, Ontario

Former members of the foundation
James A. Coutts
Carolina Gallo-La Flèche, Montréal, Quebec
Jacques Hébert
Philip Owen
Patrick Pichette
Justin Trudeau

Notes

References

External links
The Pierre Elliott Trudeau Foundation

Charities based in Canada
Scholarships in Canada
Pierre Trudeau